FabricLive.15 is a DJ mix compilation album by Nitin Sawhney, as part of the FabricLive Mix Series.

Track listing
  Koop - Relaxin' At Club F****n (Nitin Sawhney Edit) - Compost
  Nitin Sawhney - Eastern Eyes (Seiji Remix) - V2
  Nitin Sawhney - Homelands (Freeform Five Remix) - Outcaste
  Nitin Sawhney - Homelands (Dzihan & Kamien Mix) - Outcaste
  Tosca - Suzuki (Burnt Friedman/Nonplace Dub) - !K7
  Marcos Valle - Valeu (4Hero Remix) - Far Out
  Kabuki - Tempest (Atjazz Remix) - Irma
  Nathan Haines - Long (4Hero Mix) - Chillifunk
  4Hero - We Who Are Not Others (Jazzanova Mix) - Talkin' Loud
  Phuturistix - Bad Thoughts - Hospital
  Darqwan - Three Note Blue - Hospital
  Visionary Underground - Freedom - Nasha
  Niraj Chag - The Wheel - Nasha
  Ges-e & Visionary Underground - Militant24 - Nasha
  Nitin Sawhney - Beyond Skin - Outcaste
  Craig Armstrong - Hymn 2 feat. Photek - Virgin

External links
Fabric: FabricLive.15

2004 compilation albums